Pocoyo ( in Spanish and stylised as POCOYO) is a Spanish preschool interactive comedy computer animated television series created by Guillermo García Carsí, Colman López, Luis Gallego and David Cantolla, and is produced by the Spanish animation company Zinkia Entertainment, with the first two series were co-productions with Granada Kids, and the first series was a co-production of Cosgrove Hall Films, both in the United Kingdom.

Four series have been produced, each consisting of 52 seven-minute episodes. English actor and comedian Stephen Fry narrates the English-language version of the first two series of the show, while Stephen Hughes narrates the third series, called Let's Go Pocoyo, and the fourth series. José María del Río narrates the Castilian Spanish version of the show. In 2016, a new spin-off show called Pocoyo Planet was created.

On October 12, 2022, the fifth series has been greenlit to commemorate the show's 20th anniversary which will possibly release in mid-2023. It will feature more new characters such as Pocoyo's little sister, Pocoyina. Similar to the series 4 episode "Dragon Island", five of the episodes will be mixed into live action.

Overview
Set in a 3D space, with a plain white background and usually no backdrops, it is about Pocoyo, a four-year-old boy, interacting with his friends Elly, Pato, Nina, Fred the Octopus, Loula and Sleepy Bird. Viewers are encouraged to recognize situations that Pocoyo is in, and things that are going on with or around him. The Narrator usually speaks explicitly to the viewers and to the characters as well. Each character has its own distinctive dance and also a specific sound (usually from a musical instrument), and most episodes end with the characters dancing.

Characters

Main

Pocoyo (voiced by Alex Marty in series 1, Montana Smedley in series 2, Isabella Foy in series 3, and Gigi Hatt in series 4) is the title character of the series. He is a 4-year-old boy (Homo sapiens) who is full of curiosity and loves to play games and discover new things. He is very acrobatic and moves at a quick speed. Pocoyo is a very innocent, happy, and childish character who is always depicted wearing a blue three-flap hat, a blue jacket with a yellow zipper, and a pair of blue pants and shoes. His best friends are Pato, Elly, Loula, Sleepy Bird, and Baby Bird. He has a red race car and a shapeshifting bird-like spaceship called Vamoosh. Although he is very friendly and sweet and almost always in a good mood, Pocoyo is also highly self-centered, distracted by the simplest things, easily frustrated, frequently jealous of his friends, and he can be very disobedient but tries his hardest to fight his flaws and learn morals and he is also very affectionate and caring towards others and shows it often.
The Narrator (voiced by José María del Río in Castilian Spanish; Stephen Fry in series 1–2, or Stephen Hughes in series 3–4, in English) speaks over the entire show and often communicates directly with the characters. Pocoyo has a good relationship with him and is always really delighted to see (hear) him. The narrator is also at times physically involved in the events of the episodes, making him more of a heard-but-not-seen character rather than a strict narrator.
Pato is a yellow duck (Anatidae) who wears nothing but a small green top hat. He has a fondness for gardening and is often seen watering plants and flowerbeds. Pato means duck in Spanish, Portuguese, Tagalog, Tok Pisin, and Papiamento. He is a favorite amongst the show's target audience due to his enjoyable dancing and the fact that his bill turns 360 degrees. Although friendly, Pato is the most fastidious and impatient character (indicated by his bill that bends in an angle when disappointed or shocked); on occasion he completely loses his temper, jumping up and down and quacking furiously with his bill spinning rapidly. He is used as a jackhammer or missile and can become a helicopter. In the pilot episode in 2003, he was first called Ducky then changed the name to Pato.
Elly is a pink elephant (Elephantidae) who always wears a blue backpack. She loves making biscuits and tea and has a doll that she loves very much. Despite her size, she is graceful and gentle, capable of ballet dancing, and as a big sister to Pocoyo, being forgiving and always takes care of him. She is, however, can be very bossy and generally does things her way. She usually rides around on her pink scooter.
Loula an orange and magenta beagle puppy (Canis familiaris) who is Pocoyo's pet and companion. She also strictly walks on all four of her legs. She sometimes hops as she is walking. Originally, the character's name was Lucas, in tribute to creator and director Guillermo García Carsi's dog, but due to a shortage of female characters, the character was renamed Loula.
The Children are a group of children who, like The Narrator, speak over the show, answering questions asked by The Narrator in order to assist Pocoyo in solving a problem or to let Pocoyo in on what's going on.
Nina (voiced by Noel Rodriguez in 2016/2017-2020 productions, and Alba Ramos in post-mid-late 2020 productions onwards) is another human (Homo sapiens) character who is introduced in the fourth series episode of the same name. She is a young girl similar to Pocoyo (likely younger than him) who has red hair, wears a lime green hoodie with two antennas, lime green shorts, and lime green shoes. Like Pato, She greatly loves plants and nature. She naturally speaks mostly a form of gibberish with a Japanese accent, but can also speak fluent English, though not as much as Pocoyo. Her name resembles "niña", Spanish for "girl". Thanks to her robotic pet called Roberto (pronounced Roh-bear-toe), it has the ability to shrink where anyone can be shrunk as well.

Recurring
Aliens are a family of small tripodal one-eyed alien creatures that Pocoyo and his friends usually find whenever they go to space. They communicate with one another using staccato 'clicking' noises.
Sleepy Bird is a teal-coloured songbird (Passeri). She does little but sleep, and usually flies with her eyes closed. She is named "Pajaroto" in the Spanish version (reportedly named after a Zinkia employee nicknamed "Maroto", and bearing a strong resemblance to him). The character is also known as "Pajaro Dormilon" in the Latin American Spanish version. For the episodes where Nina is present (excluding her debut appearance and the episodes where she's absent), she was digitally removed from the title sequence to make room for Nina.
Baby Bird is the small, always active (he has not inherited his mother's fondness of sleeping) and loud baby of Sleepy Bird, who gets into tricky situations from which he is rescued by Pocoyo. He is also a songbird (Passeri). He is best friends with Caterpillar. Named "Pajarito" in the Spanish version ('little bird').
Ball Orchestra is a group of three ball-like creatures who play the trumpet, drums, and cymbals. In the series 4 episode "Space Postal Service", it's revealed that they live in a planet filled with instruments.
Caterpillar (named "Valentina" or "Oruga" in Spanish) is a yellow caterpillar (Lepidoptera) with a blue bow on top of her head. She speaks in gibberish and has the ability to change into a butterfly and back when she wants. She is best friends with Baby Bird and friends with Angry Alien. When overjoyed or frustrated, she tends to slam her face forward into the ground.
Fred the Octopus (Pulpo in the Spanish version) is a lunatic red octopus (Octopus rubescens) (although he is shown with only 4 legs, as to make animation rendering simpler) who speaks in gibberish like Caterpillar, and is very fond of opera singing. He appears in random episodes, sometimes as a major character, sometimes in passing. As of series 2, he is sometimes referred to as 'Fred'. His vocal style is reminiscent of Pee-wee Herman.
Music Flower and The Band are a group of flowers who play some music that Pocoyo likes.
Whale is a huge light gray sperm whale (Physeter macrocephalus) with red cheeks who lives under the sea.
Baby Spider is a small blue spider (Araneae) that hatched out of an egg that Pato found in the episode "Pato's Egg".
Yanko, introduced in the 2019 Christmas special "A Very Special Guest", is a friendly snow yeti first befriended by Pocoyo and Loula.

Development and production
Pocoyo's name was provided by David Cantolla, one of the creators, after his then two-year-old daughter used it in her nightly "Dear Child Jesus" prayers saying "Eres niño poco yo" ("You're a child little me"), but not "Eres niño como yo" ("You're a child like me"). "Pocoyo" could roughly be translated to English as "little me", though it is a made-up construction. The show is animated with Softimage XSI software.

The show was first announced to be in development in March 2003. In October, it was announced that Carlton International would co-produce and distribute the series, and that production delivery on the first half of the first series would begin in September 2004.

In March 2004, Novel Entertainment joined in production as co-producer with Carlton and Zinkia. However, nothing else was known about this initial announcement otherwise.

The show was showcased by Granada International at MIP TV in April 2005, with a broadcast window for CITV announced for the autumn. It was also announced that Stephen Fry would narrate the series in the United Kingdom.

The series was renewed for a second series on May 5, 2006.  The makers also wish to embark upon other projects, one of which may be a Pocoyo movie. In June 2006, Pocoyo was awarded the Cristal Award for the "Best TV Production" at the 30th Annecy International Animated Film Festival.

In April 2011, Zinkia and ITV Global Entertainment announced they would end their co-distribution partnership on the series and that Zinkia would now hold worldwide distribution of the series.

Episodes

Series overview

To date four series have been produced, 4 with 52 episodes. There is also an unreleased episode entitled "The See-Saw".

Series 3 is known as Let's Go Pocoyo, with episodes which have different segments. The 1st segment contains one relating to the story and the 2nd part involves stuff like counting, exercising, and learning about shapes. In the end, there is a music video recapping the story.

Series 4 consists of episodes similar in the first two series, but now with less audience engagements from the narrator and introduces another human character Nina and her Robot friend, Roberto as the main characters. Originally in YouTube, The first half produced 26 episodes and it became successful. Because of its success, the second half with 26 episodes was produced exclusively on the Spanish children's channel Clan TVE, ABC Kids in Australia, and exclusively in the Pocoyo Party game for the PlayStation 4 and the Nintendo Switch.

Since 2016, there are Specials in relation with the holidays each year with few relating to sports. Following the success of Series 4, there are episodes produced as a web series, and both series are exclusively online in YouTube. In "A Very Special Guest", a Christmas Special for 2019, Yanko, a giant snow yeti is introduced as a main character.

Series 5 will air sometime possibly in mid-2023.

Pilot (2003)
 Pilot (6 December 2003) — Pocoyo and Ducky (Pato) ride on a boat looking for some fish. Note: It was not publicly available until 2 January 2011, and the only characters featured were Pocoyo and Pato (Originally named “Ducky”).

Series 1: Pocoyo (2005)

Series 2 (2006–2007)
 Mr. Big Duck (20 August 2006) – Pato finds a pair of sunglasses and wants to be called Mr. Big Duck. Pocoyo & Baby Bird want to join him too but soon Elly wants them to come play what they usually play. Note: This is the first episode to feature Montana Smedley as Pocoyo.
 Guess What? (23 August 2006) – The viewers try to guess what objects Pocoyo is hiding.
 All for One (26 August 2006) – Pocoyo wants to play with his friends but they would rather fly up in the sky. Pocoyo wants to fly too but he can't.
 Band of Friends (29 August 2006) – Pocoyo finds a red block that makes music and it invites its shape friends to join in.
 Upside Down (1 September 2006) – Pato is stuck on the ceiling. So his friends cheer him up when they can't get him down.
 Mad Mix Machine (4 September 2006) – Pocoyo take his friends' stuff without asking and mixes them with other objects.
 The Messy Guest (7 September 2006) – Pocoyo's friends are upset that he and Baby Bird have made a mess. So Pocoyo & Baby Bird have to make amends with them by cleaning up after them.
 New on the Planet (10 September 2006) – A little green alien comes to visit Pocoyo's world.
 Pocoyo's Present (13 September 2006) – Elly tries to get Pocoyo to open a present for her.
 Elly's Ballet Class (16 September 2006) – Elly gets Pocoyo, Pato, Baby Bird, and Caterpillar to star in her ballet class, but she is too bossy.
 Pocoyo's Balloon (19 September 2006) – Pocoyo has a balloon but, he loses it! Pato and Elly make all possible for play with him, but Pocoyo only wants his lost balloon.
 Who's Calling Me Now? (23 September 2006) – Pocoyo, Pato, Elly, and Loula are having a good time with different whistles. But they end up upsetting Baby Bird on accident.
 Big Scary Slide (26 September 2006) – Pocoyo tries to conquer his fear of going down a giant slide with the help of Elly who pretends to be scared too to get Pocoyo to go on the slide.
 Elly's Shoes (29 September 2006) – Elly gets new high-heel shoes and refuses to take them off, even if they hurt her feet.
 Duck Stuck (2 October 2006) – Pato goes inside different doors but when he gets stuck in one, it's up to Pocoyo to save him.
 Scary Noises (5 October 2006) – Pato is scared of an orange alien after the tailfin of the Vamoosh goes missing.
 Not in my Backyard! (8 October 2006) – People are littering throughout Pocoyo's world with a big box of rubbish, but Pocoyo has a plan to make with good use
 Vamoosh on the Loosh (11 October 2006) – Baby Bird wants Pocoyo to teach him to drive the Vamoosh and Pocoyo has promised it. But soon, Pocoyo had broken his promise with him, so Baby Bird takes a joyride on the Vamoosh after waiting so long.
 Detective Pocoyo (14 October 2006) – Elly's doll goes missing during her picnic, and Detective Pocoyo helps her find it. They question their friends as suspects but none of them have the doll.
 Scooter Madness (17 October 2006) – Pato breaks Elly's scooter after doing one too many tricks with it after forgetting who's scooter it is.
 Lost in Space (20 October 2006) – The little green alien and Pocoyo get lost in the alien's home planet.
 Boo! (23 October 2006) – Pocoyo decides to scare his friends. The one who gets really scared is Pato.
 Party Pooper (26 October 2006) – Pocoyo only wants his friends to play his way at his party.
 My Pato! (29 October 2006) – Elly and Pocoyo have a quarrel over who gets to play with Pato on the day of his birthday causing him to leave home.
 Baby Bird Bother (1 November 2006) – Baby Bird starts following Pocoyo around. But it soon turns to annoyance when Baby Bird can't stop bothering Pocoyo, so Pocoyo shouts at him to go away, which Pocoyo regrets right away.
 Dirty Dog (4 November 2006) – Loula is dirty, and Pocoyo, Pato, and Elly try to clean her. But Loula was much too fast and too smart for them to catch her.
 The Seed (17 February 2007) – Pocoyo takes care of a seed. But Sleepy Bird, Loula, and Pato mistake it for a snack, a ball, and an egg. So Pocoyo has to shoo them off every time they attempt to steal his seed.
 Runaway Hat (20 February 2007) – Pato's hat has been blown away by the wind and he decides to hide from his friends to not have his bald head revealed.
 Invisible Pocoyo (23 February 2007) – Pocoyo turns invisible with a device. He wants to show his friends but they're busy. So he pranks them with the invisible device.
 Noise To My Ears (26 February 2007) – Pato wants to take a nap but his friends' noise making is waking him up.
 Baby Bird Sitting (2 March 2007) – Pato tries to babysit Baby Bird, but Baby Bird and Caterpillar's noisy and messy antics drive him crazy so Pocoyo helps out.
 Everyone's Present (5 March 2007) – Pocoyo, Pato, and Elly each receive presents.
 Magic Act (8 March 2007) – Pocoyo tries to do magic tricks.
 Picnic Puzzle (11 March 2007) – Food is mysteriously disappearing, and Pocoyo and Elly think Pato is to blame.
 Pocoyo's Puppet Show (14 March 2007) – Pocoyo tries to put on a puppet show.
 Pato's Egg (17 March 2007) – Pato finds an egg. And when it hatched, he becomes a dad to a baby spider which Pocoyo and Elly are scared of.
 Dance Off! (20 March 2007) – Pocoyo and Pato try to compete against each other in a dance off and it's up to Elly's dance moves to keep it from getting out of hand.
 Get Lost Loula (23 March 2007) – After Loula finds everyone in hide and seek and she gets credit instead of Pocoyo, he throws a ball very far away to get Loula to go away, his friends are angry at him so he has to find her.
 Sneaky Shoes (26 March 2007) – Pato finds a pair of shoes that help him run faster, but little does know that the shoes seem to have a mind of their own, especially when Elly finds out the buzzing on the shoe, and when they get out of control when he tries to take them off.
 Shutterbug (29 March 2007) – Pato isn't happy with some of his pictures of his friends. And that's all because, they do silly things when he's not looking.
 Angry Alien (2 April 2007) – An evil alien tries unsuccessfully to take over. And the reason is because he is too small and everything in Pocoyo's world is too big.
 Pato Underwater (5 April 2007) – Pato decides to meet his friends Octopus and Whale, but finds out his toys don't work underwater.
 Pato's Paintings (8 April 2007) – Pocoyo tries to get Pato interested in painting.
 Monster Mystery (11 April 2007) – Pocoyo wants to scare his friends with a monster mask but it backfires.
 Poczilla (14 April 2007) – Pocoyo and Pato pretend to be monsters, not realizing they're scaring off the tiny people of a city.
 Elly on Ice (17 April 2007) – Pocoyo and Pato are having fun ice skating and Elly wants to join in while trying not to slip on the ice.
 Farewell Friends (20 April 2007) Pato is leaving, but not in a way you would expect...
 Double Trouble (23 April 2007) – Pato makes a clone of himself so he can go on the see-saw when Pocoyo wanted to play catch with him but he didn't want to.
 Horse! (26 April 2007) – Pocoyo loses his temper when his friends don't give him a real horse.
 Elly's Tea Party (29 April 2007) – Elly invites Pocoyo, Pato and Baby Bird over for a tea party but her bossiness nearly ruins it.
 Talent Show (2 May 2007) – Pocoyo and his friends put on a talent show. But Caterpillar is too nervous to do her turn.
 Remember When... (4 May 2007) – A clip episode where Pocoyo and his friends watch home movies. But they fight over the clips they find funny. Note: This is the final episode to feature Montana Smedley as Pocoyo, Stephen Fry as the Narrator, and to be produced by Granada Kids.

Series 3: Let's Go Pocoyo (2010)

 Pocoyo's Band (30 June 2010) – Pocoyo finds a box with musical instruments. He learns how to use them and calls his friends to form a rock band. The first attempt is a disaster, but in the end they learn to play in order and manage to make beautiful music. Note: This is the first episode to feature Isabella Foy as Pocoyo and Stephen Hughes as the Narrator.
 Picnic (3 July 2010) – Pocoyo, Pato and Elly go on a picnic. Suddenly the sandwiches in the basket begin to move on their own and run away. The trio chase them throughout the scene until they catch them. In the end, Pocoyo discovers with his magnifying glass that it's the ants who were trying to take the sandwiches and invites them to share the picnic with them.
 Pato's Shower (6 July 2010) – Pato has his towel, his soap and his brush ready to take a shower when the phone rings. He goes to answer and when he returns he realizes that his things have disappeared. Pato decides to locate them, and runs out that they his friends are playing with them. In the end, Pocoyo and Elly realize that it wasn't right to take their things without permission and they help Pato to make his shower unforgettable.
 The Garden (9 July 2010) – Pato is taking care of his garden when Pocoyo arrives. He also wants to plant a plant. Pato lends him a gardening book so he can follow the steps. Pocoyo ignores the book, so he only manages to grow a ridiculous plant.
 Pato the Postman (11 July 2010) – Pocoyo writes a letter to Elly but he needs a postman. Luckily Pato is ready to deliver his mail. Yours and everyone's! The situation becomes crazy for poor Pato who can't cope. His friends, realizing it, ask him for one last delivery, which leads to a surprise party that they all enjoy together.
 Colours (14 July 2010) – Pocoyo is building a tower of colored blocks. Suddenly he finds a red cube that speaks. The red cube has a yellow friend, a blue friend, and a green friend. Pocoyo goes to look for Pato so that he can see them, but when Pato arrives, the "toridoris" have camouflaged themselves with the blocks of the tower. Pocoyo finds them with the help of the children, and returns to look for Pato.
 Ready, Steady, Go! (17 July 2010) – Pocoyo, Pato and Elly challenge each other to a race. Everything starts very well, but things get complicated when everyone starts cheating to get to first place. After various adventures they learn that winning is not the most important thing: the important thing is to have fun.
 Camping (20 July 2010) – Pocoyo, Pato and Elly get ready to go camping. When it gets dark they play scaring each other, but what started as a game gets complicated when they go to sleep: everyone is scared by a mysterious noise. The next morning they discover that the terrifying noise was simply the snoring of Sleepy Bird.
 Space Mission (23 July 2010) – Pocoyo and Pato are playing with their friend Green Alien. They build a rocket with boxes and enjoy pretending to fly through space between planets and stars. At the height of the mission, Green Alien's parents arrive, reminding him that they really have to come home.
 Travel with Pato (26 July 2010) – Pato is about to go on a trip, but he realizes that he has forgotten his suitcase. She calls Pocoyo and Elly and asks them to take her to the airport as quickly as possible. They take the bus and try to get to the airport before Pato's flight takes off.
 Playtime (29 July 2010) – Pocoyo appears with a box full of toys: building blocks, a puzzle and a ball. His friends want to play with him, but Pocoyo won't let them because he prefers to play alone. In the end he realizes that he prefers to play with his friends and again asks them to forgive him and ask them to play with him.
 Tennis Everyone (1 August 2010) – The friends are ready to enjoy a game of tennis. Pato is a great champion and it seems that nobody can dispute his superiority on the track. When Caterpillar offers to play, everyone laughs at her for being so small. In the end she shows them that you can also be a great champion being small.
 Hide and Seek (4 August 2010) – Pocoyo wants to play hide and seek but he doesn't understand the rules of the game very well. With the help of his friends he learns the dynamics and is finally ready to look for them. When Pocoyo finally finds them, they have prepared a surprise party that they all enjoy together.
 Party Time (7 August 2010) – Pocoyo, Pato and Elly are preparing a birthday party. Fred wants to help them, and Pocoyo asks him to blow up balloons. Poor Fred has a bit of a hard time but in the end he gets a pleasant surprise: the party they were preparing was for him!
 Wheels (10 August 2010) – Our friends are taking a walk. Elly rides her bike, Pocoyo rides his scooter and Pato rides his skateboard. Caterpillar wants to ride with them too, but her friends' vehicles are too big for her. Thanks to her friends, in the end she is able to ride all of them.
 Elly's Bath (13 August 2010) – Pocoyo goes to look for Elly to play ball, but Elly is taking a bath. While Pocoyo waits, Elly plays with the bubbles in the bath and with her rubber ducky. Elly finally comes out of the bathroom, but Pocoyo doesn't feel like playing ball anymore: he wants to play in the bathroom too!
 The Amazing Tower (15 August 2010) – Pato is building a tower with colored blocks. Pocoyo wants to play too and Pato lends him a cube so he can make his own tower. But when they run out, Pocoyo takes the blocks from Pato's tower, collapsing it. The two fight, until Pocoyo comes up with a great idea: to build a tower together.
 Pocoyo's New Toys (18 August 2010) – Pato, Elly, and Caterpillar are playing with their new toys: a hula hoop, a kite, and a jump rope. Pocoyo tries to play, but he doesn't know how. Fortunately, his friends lend him a hand and Pocoyo learns to play with all the toys.
 Bathing Loula (21 August 2010) – Loula has gotten into a puddle and now Pocoyo and Elly have to bathe her. But Loula doesn't like bathing at all and she runs away again and again. After several tries, Loula is very clean, but now there is someone else who needs a bath.
 Magic Fingers (24 August 2010) – Pocoyo appears wearing a magician's hat and a magic wand: he's going to do magic! To the surprise of his friends, he makes his fingers disappear, then his hand, and finally his foot. In the end Caterpillar discovers that it was just a trick.
 Cooking With Elly (27 August 2010) – Elly is in the kitchen. She is wearing an apron because she has just baked a birthday cake for Caterpillar. Suddenly Pocoyo and Pato appear and, without knowing how, the cake ends up on the floor. The three of them prepare another cake and set the table to surprise Caterpillar. In the end, they also get a surprise of their own.
 Elly's Market (30 August 2010) – Elly has set up a market to play with her friends. He has oranges, apples and bananas. Pocoyo and Pato have fun playing with the fruit stand and break it. They have to fix it and place each fruit in its place.
 Pato's Bedtime (2 September 2010) – Pato is ready for bed. He is wearing his pajamas and has picked up his teddy bear. But Pocoyo keeps playing and won't let him sleep. In the end Pocoyo falls asleep too, but with Pato's teddy bear!
 A Hole in One (5 September 2010) – Elly is playing golf. Pocoyo tries to imitate her, but since he doesn't know how to play, he cheats to beat Elly. Elly gets mad at him, but in the end she teaches him how to play without cheating.
 Pocoyo's Camera (8 September 2010) – Pocoyo finds a camera and goes to find his friends to take pictures of them. His friends are caught by surprise and they are not amused by the photos they have taken. In the end, they all take much more fun photos together and have a great time.
 Painting With Pocoyo (11 September 2010) – Pocoyo and his friends are painting a fruit still life. Pato is painting with a brush, Elly with pencils and Pocoyo with crayons. Baby Bird is placed in the still life for his friends to include him in their drawings. While he waits, he eats the fruit, forcing them to start all over. In the end, everyone paints the only thing left in the still life: Baby Bird.
 Playing Dress Up (14 September 2010) – Pocoyo, Elly and Pato are playing dress up. Elly has put on polka dot shoes, Pato a red hat and a bow tie, and Pocoyo yellow pants. Caterpillar wants to play with them, but there is nothing in her size. With a little imagination, Caterpillar gets to wear her own costume.
 Magic Box (17 September 2010) – Pocoyo has two magic boxes. He puts a phone inside one of the boxes and closes it. The phone appears inside the other box, as if by magic. He decides to make Pato's ball disappear to play a prank on him, but Pato isn't amused. Fortunately the ball appears and they both end up playing together.
 Pocoyo's Restaurant (20 September 2010) – Pocoyo and Elly have set up a restaurant. They have everything: tables, chairs, plates, glasses, cutlery, etc. There first guest is Angry Alien who is hungry. Thanks to their effort they get him to leave happy. But a curious surprise awaits them.
 Wake Up, Pocoyo! (23 September 2010) – The day begins and Pato gets out of bed full of energy, while Pocoyo can't wake up. Pato gets him out of bed and takes him to play, but Pocoyo is still asleep. Little by little he wakes up, but when he is having the best time it is time to go to sleep again.
 Ahoy, Pocoyo! (26 September 2010) – Pato and Pocoyo pretend to be pirates. With the help of a map and a spyglass, they search for a treasure chest on the island, while avoiding hungry piranhas Baby Bird and Caterpillar along the way.
 Elly's Computer (29 September 2010) – Elly is playing with her computer, which has a screen, a mouse and a keyboard, while Pocoyo waits to play ball with her. Pocoyo gets mad because Elly doesn't play with him, but Elly finishes her video game and they can finally play ball together.
 Going To The Beach (1 October 2010) – Pocoyo and Pato receive a postcard from Elly, who is on vacation at the beach. Not to be outdone, they set up their own beach. Armed with their sunglasses, a bucket and a shovel they build a magnificent sand castle. The only thing missing is for Elly to come back and they can all enjoy their beach together.
 Big & Small (4 October 2010) – Pocoyo plays with a remote control that turns things big or small: it transforms Pato's tower into a tiny tower, and Loula's bone or Elly's doll into huge objects. of the end, to the anger of his friends, Pocoyo returns everything to its original size.
 Face Painting (7 October 2010) – Pocoyo and Pato are painting pictures and Elly wants them to paint her new doll. So they paint one picture of the eyes, one of the nose, one of the mouth, and two pictures of the ears. So that Elly doesn't get angry, they decide to make a giant painting with all the parts of the doll.
 Supermarket (10 October 2010) – Pocoyo and Pato have a supermarket. Elly calls them to ask for a bottle, which Pocoyo puts in a basket and delivers to her. Elly calls again asking for a carton, and then a can. After a few orders, Pocoyo and Pato are exhausted. Finally, Elly writes them a shopping list so they can put everything in their cart at once.
 Elly's Playhouse (13 October 2010) – Elly has a little house to play in. Her house has a door, a roof and a window. But when Pocoyo and Pato play with her, the house collapses. With the help of Elly they manage to raise it again, putting everything in its place.
 Pocoyo's Puppet Theater (16 October 2010) – Pocoyo finds a box full of puppets. Elly helps him build a small theater so he can play. They already have puppets and a theater with its curtain, but they still lack something very important: an audience!
 Up & Down (19 October 2010) – Pocoyo is teaching Baby Bird the difference between up and down. To do this they get on the see-saw, but Baby Bird is not very clear about what is up and what is down. They climb to the top of the slide, and jump off. But he still has doubts: in the end they are go for a ride in the Vamoosh. Baby Bird finally has it clear!
 Pocoyo's Breakfast (22 October 2010) – It's time for breakfast and Elly has prepared orange juice, milk and cereal for Pocoyo. But Pocoyo prefers to see what his friends have for breakfast. Thus, he sees that Fred has algae for breakfast, Baby Bird seeds and his friend Strange Alien, planetary rocks... In the end, he finds out his breakfast is not so bad!
 Traffic Jam (25 October 2010) – Pocoyo is playing at being a traffic cop. With the help of a traffic light and a whistle, he tries to get his friends to respect the signals and cross the pedestrian crossing. However, it does not seem like an easy task.
 Pato's Living Room (28 October 2010) – Pato's living room has a sofa, a table, a TV and a rug. Pato is preparing to calmly watch television, when his friends break into his house. But Pato doesn't feel like company and kicks them out. In the end he feels sorry to leave them out and asks them to come back.
 Cinema (1 November 2010) – Pato is going to show a movie for his friends, who are his audience. He shows us the screen, the seats and the projector. It all starts out great until the movie stalls and the audience laughs. Pato gets angry but his friends get him to sit with them to enjoy the show.
 Elly's New Doll – Elly's new doll has two arms, two legs and a head. Elly has to run an errand and leaves Pocoyo and Pato in charge of the doll. When she returns, his doll is not as she had left it. Will they get it back to the way it was before? 
 Circus (4 November 2010) – Pocoyo, Pato and Elly are setting up a circus with acrobats, jugglers and clowns.  At the beginning the artists are not very coordinated, but in the end the performances are very funny and the audience have a great time.
 The Best Bedroom (7 November 2010) – Elly's bedroom has a bed and a closet full of clothes. Pato's has a bedside table and a lamp. Pocoyo's, a box full of toys. The three think they have the best bedroom, but which of the three is the best? 
 Pocoyo Goes To School (10 November 2010) – Caterpillar and Baby Bird are at school. They carry backpacks, notebooks and pencils. Elly is the teacher. Pocoyo and Pato don't want to play with them, they prefer to play ball. But little by little they like what they do at school more and they join their friends.
 Art (13 November 2010) – The friends have made an exhibition that includes different artistic disciplines such as painting, sculpture and photography. Pato plays the role of an art critic and visits the exhibition, but there is nothing he likes. The others ask him to show his artistic skills, and then Pato realizes that making art is not that easy.
 Pocoyo Recycles (16 November 2010) – Pocoyo and Pato find some recycling bins. Elly shows up with a bunch of things to recycle: bottles, cans, and newspapers. Fred also has things to recycle, but Pocoyo and Pato have to convince him that it's a good idea.
 Down on The Farm (19 November 2010) – Pocoyo, Elly and Pato are in the garden where they have planted tomatoes, carrots and lettuce. It's time to pick them up and eat, when suddenly the vegetables start to move on their own. They finally catch them and find out why they were moving.
 Nurse Elly (22 November 2010) – Pocoyo doesn't feel like cleaning up and pretends to be sick. Then Elly tells him that he should get into bed, wear a bandage and take some medicine. Pocoyo eventually admits that he wasn't sick and will help his friends clean up.
 Fishing With Pocoyo (25 November 2010) – Pocoyo and Pato are fishing. They have a net and a rod with a curious hook: Caterpillar. They cast the cane and wait. Caterpillar reaches the bottom of the sea and befriends a fish. Pocoyo and Pato can't catch anything and they have to go down to the bottom of the sea to see what's happening. Note: This is the final episode to feature Isabella Foy as Pocoyo.

Series 4: Pocoyo (2016–)

Series 4 – Part One (2016–2017)
 Holidays – (28 Nov 2016) Pocoyo, Pato, & Elly have gone back home and tell what they did for holiday. Note: This is the first episode to feature Gigi Hatt as Pocoyo.
 Christmas Tree – (17 Dec 2016) Pato has decided to have a Christmas Tree of his own, but with many tries attempted, poor Pato can't even find one...
 Chicks Dig Me – (27 Jan 2017) Pocoyo has to take care of the chicks he finds when taking a stroll along with Pato's help.
 Call Me – (17 Feb 2017)  Pato has bought himself a phone via delivery. But its constant ringing causes problems.
 Muck Struck – (3 Mar 2017) Pocoyo, Pato, & Elly must clean up the dirty pond they found in order to use fresh water again.
 Nina – (24 Mar 2017) Pato finds something strange on his flowers where he, along with Pocoyo realize it was a strange young girl name Nina along with a robot named Roberto.
 Hack Attack – (14 Apr 2017) Pocoyo and his friends take care of Roberto, but an accident occurs where Roberto goes out of control.
 Hole Lotta Trouble – (28 Apr 2017) Pocoyo, Pato, & Elly investigate a strange black hole they find which leads to different worlds.
 Great Shot! – (12 May 2017) Pocoyo and his friends each make up rules in a tennis game.
 Disco Fleaver – (19 May 2017) Loula has fleas, so Pocoyo & Nina, shrunken by Roberto, have to find a way to get rid of them.
 House Of Colours – (9 Jun 2017) Elly wants to paint the whole house pink, but Pocoyo & Pato would rather paint it in different colors.
 Summer Hike – (30 Jun 2017) Pato has invited Pocoyo & Nina for a summer hike on the mountains.
 Bumbleberry Surprise – (7 Jul 2017) Pocoyo and his friends want to bake a cake, so they have to look for a unique kind of berries inside a bush in order to make one.
 Are We There Yet? – (21 Jul 2017) Pocoyo and the others are on their way to the beach.
 Tourist Trapped – (11 Aug 2017) Multiple green aliens have came by in the Pocoyo World, wanting to take pictures of everything in the world as souvenirs.
 Time After Time Before Time – (8 Sep 2017) Pocoyo & Nina time travel to the past using Roberto as a time machine in order to eat the cupcakes Elly accidentally dropped and explore further beyond.
 Tiny Fun Park – (22 Sep 2017) Due to not being able to go to a real amusement park, Pocoyo and his friends make their own theme park using Roberto's ability to make everyone shrink.
 Halloween Tales – (13 Oct 2017) Pocoyo, Pato, & Elly make their own stories to scare Nina, but she finds them funny.
 Rock Is A Hard Place – (10 Nov 2017)Pocoyo and his friends make their own band, but things get out of hand with each one having a fight over who has more attention.
 Angry Alien Strikes Back – (15 Nov 2017) Angry Alien plans revenge to take over the Pocoyo World with his new invention.
 Magic Words – (16 Nov 2017) Strange things are happening as each object changes to a different kind of object.
 Sleep Guard – (18 Nov 2017) Pocoyo is on a guard duty to prevent noises as Sleepy Bird is asleep.
 Insert Coin – (19 Nov 2017) Angry Alien has kidnapped Elly's doll and Pocoyo has to save it.
 Space Postal Service – (8 Dec 2017) Pato and Baby Bird have to deliver a package to a Green Alien in space
 An Alien Christmas Carol – (15 Dec 2017) Angry Alien plans to ruin Christmas once and for all.
 Dance Off Part Two – (22 Dec 2017) Elly & Nina face Pocoyo & Pato in a dance battle.

Series 4 – Part Two (2020-2022)
 The Grand Final – Pocoyo sees Pato and Elly playing basketball, and he wants to play basketball with them.
 Slippery Pato – Pato pours far too much moisturising oil on himself and disappoints Pocoyo and Elly because he's too slippery to play.
 The Dino Box – Pocoyo makes an amazing machine that can transform people into dinosaurs.
 Pirates – Pocoyo is playing pirates with a toy boat when he finds out that Pato has a real one.
 The Pink Perfume – Elly receives a bottle of her favourite perfume, but she has to be careful not to use it up too quickly.
 Robot Pocoyo – Pocoyo likes robots so much that he ends up becoming one.
 Pato's Phone – Pato is so obsessed with his smartphone that he's not interested in anything else.(Note: This May be a sequel to “Call Me”.)
 Fancy Dress Party – Pocoyo and friends find out that there is going to be a party and fancy dress competition, and Pato is confident that he will win.
 Strike! – Pato becomes obsessed with bowling when he finds he never shoots, no matter how hard he tries, while Elly and Pocoyo succeed effortlessly.
 Let's Tidy Up – Pato has just finished tidying up his room when Elly and Pocoyo arrive to play.
 The Balloon – Nina has a beautiful balloon and Pocoyo and Pato want to play with it. They promise to look after it but almost immediately it flies away into the sky and they have to get it back.
 The Silence Challenge – Pocoyo, Pato and Elly challenge the Narrator to a game where he must keep quiet.
 Overprotective Roberto – When Roberto sees Nina get a scrape while playing, he becomes so worried that he decides to protect her at all costs.
 Pocoyo's Car – Pocoyo decides that he no longer needs any of his old toys, but has second thoughts when he sees Nina riding on his old car.
 Inventions – Pocoyo and Nina have promised to help their friends, however they find out that Pato is organising a party. Eager to be done as soon as possible, Pocoyo and Nina come up with some crazy inventions to save time.
 My Hero – After Pocoyo rescues Caterpillar from a hole, she starts to idolise him.
 The Rescue – Pocoyo discovers that Caterpillar is stuck at the top of a tree and he, Pato and Elly try to get her down.
 Pocoyo's Friend – Pocoyo is having plenty of fun playing with an invisible friend.
 Elly's Picnic – Elly organises a picnic with her friends, where each must bring something. Everything is going fine until they find out that Nina brought ants and they must get rid of them before they eat all the food.
 Nina Discovers the World – Walking along Pocoyo's World, Nina gradually discovers new objects with Pocoyo's help.
 The Remote Control – Pocoyo and Pato want to see different TV programs and start a terrible struggle over the remote control. In the midst of the chaos and extreme zapping, Pocoyo discovers that the remote does not only change the TV channel.
 The Tennis Racket – Elly is excited to play tennis with Pato and Pocoyo, but the problem starts when Elly finds out that Pato and Pocoyo's idea of tennis does not match the game's rules.
 Nina The Dog Trainer – Nina adores Loula and wants to spend the afternoon with her, but Pocoyo warns her that taking care of a dog is a huge responsibility.
 Prank Day – Pocoyo is very excited on Prank Day, and plays pranks on everyone, including the Narrator. 
 I Don't Want to Go to Sleep – It's late and everyone has gone to bed to sleep except for Pocoyo, who prefers to continue playing with his cars, with the ball or with the blocks.
 Winter Games – There has been a big snowfall and Pocoyo is getting ready to compete in the Winter Games with his friends.
 Dragon Island – Pocoyo, Elly and Pato embark on a great adventure to the Canary Islands, in order to find a mythical dragon that lives in the area. (This episode features a hybrid animation between 3D and real shots)

Specials (2016–2022)
 Crazy Inventions (Halloween special 2016) – Pocoyo & Elly decide to use Pato as a test subject for the invention they made, but Pato ends up in a virtual world due to the virus from the machine during the test and Pocoyo & Elly have to save him.
 Easter Eggs (Easter special 2017) – Pocoyo & his friends are hunting for Easter eggs, but only Elly realizes that one contains a baby bird inside from Sleepy Bird.
 Pocoyo and Nina's Terror Show (Halloween special 2017) – Pocoyo & Nina put on a show just to scare others, but their efforts just end up making everyone laugh. However it was until they do have help from a group of skeletons.
 Nina's Easter Day (Easter special 2018) – Pocoyo, Elly, & Pato have got themselves each of a chocolate egg, but Nina & Roberto steal each one of them believing that those eggs contain each a baby chick.
 The Big Soccer Match (FIFA Soccer World Cup 2018 special) – Nina wants to play in a soccer match and form a team, but she needs to train with Roberto in order to win against a match between Pocoyo and his team.
 Pocoyo and the Haunted House (Halloween special 2018) – Pocoyo & Pato find themselves in a haunted house while trick or treating in a Halloween night where Pocoyo decides to explore inside, causing Pato to feel very anxious. However, inside the house ends being up a Halloween party Elly, Nina, & the others are hosting.
 You Are Welcome for Thanksgiving (Thanksgiving Special 2018) – It's Thanksgiving and Pocoyo & Nina are excited. However, the two are too hyper, constantly repeating "Thank you!", annoying Pato.
 Pocoyo's Christmas Carol (Christmas special 2018) – Pocoyo & Pato have a quarrel on Christmas Eve and Elly has to find a way for them to get along again or things could eventually get worse.
 The Easter Rabbit (Easter special 2019) – Pocoyo, Pato, & Nina have gotten each of their eggs hidden by the Easter Rabbit. They have to follow the clues if they want their eggs back but Pato seems impatient wanting his egg back as well.
 Halloween Potion (Halloween Special 2019) – Pocoyo, Pato, Elly & Caterpillar go trick-o-treating, but Pato sees a monster that frightens him, which is actually a transformed Caterpillar who drank Elly's pumpkin soup despite the fact she shouldn't be drinking it.
 A Very Special Guest (Christmas Special 2019) – Pocoyo and Loula meet Yanko the yeti while gathering ornaments for a Christmas tree. Pocoyo invites Yanko to the Christmas Party he and his friends are hosting but his friends are scared of Yanko's large appearance and reject his invitation to the party.
 Caterpillar's Egg (Easter Special 2020) – Pocoyo, Pato, Elly & Caterpillar make a contest of painted eggs and then go on an Easter egg hunt, whereas Caterpillar makes a painted egg only glows in the dark.
 The Reflection (Halloween Special 2020 I) – Pocoyo is dressed up as a wizard for Halloween and decides to trick-o-treat alone. But before he leaves, he accidentally uses a spell on the mirror as he's practicing himself to be scary in a wizard costume, causing his reflection to come out from the mirror and cause trouble by stealing candy from everyone else without Pocoyo knowing.
 Elly's Wand (Halloween Special 2020 II) – Elly & her apprentices, Pocoyo & Pato are making a potion on Halloween night. However, as Elly leaves to gather more ingredients, Pocoyo & Pato accidentally lose the wand Elly left on the table as they make a mess putting more ingredients into the pot. The wand is later found by Caterpillar, as she causes havoc using magic spells.
 Space Christmas (Christmas Special 2020 I) – Pocoyo, Pato, & Elly spends time with the Angry Alien on Christmas, but he doesn't seem too happy.
 Christmas Far from Home (Christmas Special 2020 II) – Yanko has invited Pocoyo, Pato, Elly, & Loula to the South Pole during the Christmas break. However, Pato doesn't enjoy the experience, especially when Yanko gives him food made from fish.
 Easter Eggs Surprise (Easter Special 2021) – Pocoyo, Pato, & Elly have finished painting the eggs for Easter, but the eggs later go missing and the trio have to solve using a trail of clues which they realize that those eggs are Sleepy Bird's, containing a baby bird each.
 Pocoyo's World Sports Games (Tokyo 2020 Olympics Special) – Pocoyo is hosting his own World Sports games. However, Pocoyo, as a judge, doesn't treat the competitors fairly, as giving 1st place medals to anyone he wants, mostly the ones who aren't doing well in each game.
 Angry Alien's First Halloween (Halloween Special 2021 I) – Angry Alien once again tries to conquer the Pocoyo World and this time on Halloween. However, it gets foiled again as Pocoyo and his friends frighten him with their costumes and some Halloween decorations.
 Pocoyo's Scary Halloween (Halloween Special 2021 II) – Pocoyo invited the Hermanos Chihuahua, a group of three skeletons in effort to scare Elly and Pato. However, the plan backfires instead, with Elly and Pato scaring them with their masks.
 The Day of the Dead (Day of the Dead Special 2021) - It's the Day of the Dead, and Pato is sad because he misses his grandfather, but thanks to Nina's help, a very special person comes to visit Pato that night.
 Christmas.. at the Beach – (Christmas Special 2021) – Yanko is excited that his family is coming to dinner for Christmas but Pocoyo, Pato and Baby Bird force him to spend Christmas at the beach with them.
 The Goblin Mask (Halloween Special 2022) – It is the night of Halloween and Pocoyo, Pato, Elly, and Nina are dressed for Halloween. However, Nina is causing trouble by stealing candy from others, but it is actually her mask who possessed her.
 Elly's Auntie Phantie (Day of the Dead Special 2022) – Elly has made an alter for her deceased relative Auntie Phantie in order to summon her and visit in the Pocoyo World. However Pocoyo, Pato, Baby Bird, and Caterpillar steal the things from the alter which turns out they're helping out as well.
 Christmas Stakeout (Christmas Special 2022) – Pocoyo, Pato, and Nina try to catch whoever is going to give their gifts for Christmas. But in the end, whoever gave their gifts remains a mystery.

Webisodes (2019–2023)
 Space Holidays – (21 Jun 2019) – Elly goes on a space vacation with Pato & Pocoyo. But Pocoyo is in an argument with Pato; as Pocoyo wants to go to the mountains & Pato wants to go to the beach.
 Back to School – (23 Aug 2019) – Everyone's excited to go back to school, except Pocoyo... 
 World Domination on Ice (13 Dec 2019) – Angry Alien once again plans to take over Pocoyo's World. but again, his plan backfires thanks to all the snow.
 Dinosaurs – (17 April 2020) – Pocoyo, Pato, & Elly are playing dinosaurs with each other, but the noise they cause is bothering Sleepy Bird in her nap time.
 Formula Pato – (26 June 2020) – Pato has ordered an engine and also brings his car to life in order for him to win the race. However, the car's playful personality backfires Pato's desire to win the race. (Note: This episode is a promotion to Pocoyo Racing for the mobile.)
 The Colouring Book – (4 September 2020) – Pocoyo is reading a book about colours, where the colour of every thing changes into the same colour the book's showing. However, as Elly & Pato come in, they later start fighting over the book where things go horribly wrong. (Note: This episode is a promotion to the release of Pocoyo Colors App.)
 The Ball Orchestra's Party – (25 September 2020) Pocoyo, Pato, & Elly have been invited to the Ball Orchestra's party, but they have to solve some puzzles for them to go there.
 The Videogame Party – (16 April 2021) – Pocoyo and his friends prepare a party to celebrate spring, but Angry Alien plans to ruin the party but it backfires. However, he manages to steal the party invitations. (Note: This episode is a promotion and follow up to Pocoyo Party for the PlayStation 4 and the Nintendo Switch.)
 The Treasure Hunt – (30 July 2021) – Pocoyo, Pato and Elly team up to find a pirate treasure at the bottom of the sea.
 Yanko's First Day – (13 August 2021) – It is Yanko's 1st day in school, but he feels nervous.
 The Top Hat – (21 January 2022) – Fred arrives late for his show and in his haste he drops his magic hat. As Pocoyo and Pato find Fred's lost hat, they play with it, but soon find out that the not only the hat does magic but magically transports them from different worlds. 
 The Universe-Changing Remote – (25 February 2022) Pocoyo and Pato find a remote control with a red button. Every time they press it, they change some physical law of the universe. However, the remote control is one of Angry Alien's inventions for world domination in the Pocoyo world.
 The Bee – (18 March 2022) – On a beautiful spring day, Pocoyo, Pato and Elly are playing ball. But when they go to retrieve it as Pocoyo hits the ball out of bounds, they meet a bee and try to run away from it.
 What is a Cow? – (22 April 2022)- Pocoyo, Elly and Pato find a chick. He is very sad because he is lost, and his friend Lola, a cow is worried. Pocoyo and his friends try to help the chick find her friend, but first, they will have to learn what a cow is.
 All Aboard the Train – (27 May 2022) – Pato, Elly, and everyone else go on a train ride whereas Pocoyo is a conductor.
 Fireman Pato – (17 June 2022) – Pocoyo and Elly are repairing the Vamoosh when Loula gets stuck inside. Luckily Fireman Pato is able to free Loula. However, trying to help his other friends like Caterpillar, Fred and the Ball Orchestra is harder than it looks for Pato.
 A Viking Adventure – (8 July 2022) – Pocoyo, Pato, and Elly go on a sea sailing adventure as Vikings as they encounter certain obstacles to face the Kraken (Fred the Octopus).
 The Juices – (12 August 2022) – Elly has made purple juices from red and blue fruits and her guests enjoy them, but as Pocoyo and Pato come to help, they play around to mix other types of fruit to create other colors for the juice, rather than follow the directions Elly gave them to create purple juice from the exact fruits.
 The Unicorn – (23 September 2022) Pocoyo, Pato, Elly, and Nina are drawing animals when Nina draws a Unicorn. However as unicorns are Nina's favorite "animal", she wants to find one to prove its existence, even Pocoyo and the others don't believe so.
 The Big Little Race – (3 March 2023) Pocoyo, Pato, and Elly are doing a race and then joined by Angry Alien. However, Angry Alien decides to cheat in order to win the race.

Broadcast

United Kingdom
On September 11, 2007, Granada International pre-sold the first and second series to Five's Milkshake! strand. This deal meant that while the CITV Channel could still air the series, they could not air it within Milkshake!'s airtime.

Spain
In June 2006, TVE2 and Boomerang acquired free and pay-TV rights respectively to the series from Zinkia. The first series premiered on TVE2 in October 2006. The second series premiered on the network in April 2008. The third series, Let's Go Pocoyo began airing in 2010.

In October 2017, Clan acquired the TV rights to the fourth series.

Other
In April 2005, the Australian Broadcasting Corporation became the first international broadcaster to acquire the series. In October, Granada pre-sold the series to Treehouse TV (Canada), Disney Channel (Southeast Asia), TVNZ (New Zealand), CYBC (Cyprus) Gulf DTH/Showtime and MBC (Middle East), IBC (Iceland), EBS (South Korea), Alter Channel (Greece), RTFBH (Bosnia), RTV (Slovenia), BabyTV (Israel) and the ABC (Australia). At the time, deals were current underway for Germany, Japan, Finland, Sweden, France and Hong Kong.

In March 2006, Nickelodeon acquired French broadcast rights. This was followed up in May with Granada pre-selling the series to KiKA (Germany), Discovery Kids (Latin America), WOWOW (Japan) and MNET (South Africa), and Zinkia selling Portuguese rights to RTP in June. In October, Granada pre-sold the pay TV rights to the series to Disney Channel Scandivania, while Yle acquired free-TV rights to the first series in Finland.

In April 2008, Zinkia pre-sold Mexican broadcast rights to Grupo Televisa.

In 2010, the series entered Italy when Zinkia sold broadcast rights to Rai 2 in March and the United States in April when ITV Global Entertainment sold the series to Nick Jr. for broadcast within the spring. In the US, the series was originally shown as 7-minute segments between shows before being expanded to a half-hour show from July 23, 2011, to January 1, 2015. Currently, episodes of the show were made available on the Noggin app. Episodes of "Pocoyo Planet" are also currently on the app as well.

In 2021, the series returned to US broadcast on Cartoon Network on September 13, 2021, as part of their preschool block Cartoonito. The show was removed from Cartoonito's lineup on September 23, 2022, and was removed from HBO Max on September 30, 2022. The broadcast of the series on PBS Kids came to an end on December 26, 2021, and it, along with the show it aired with, was replaced with reruns of Dinosaur Train to the 7:30 a.m. weekend morning timeslot.

In other media

Specials/Movies

Pocoyo & the Space Circus
A special, titled Pocoyo & the Space Circus, aired during the 2008 Christmas season on both La 2 and CITV Channel. It was announced for international distribution by Zinkia and ITV Global Entertainment in March 2009.

The special centers on The Martian Brothers, a pack of 5 aliens from outer space that arrive in Pocoyo's World, hosting a circus. Pocoyo, Elly, and Pato along with Loula join in as well.

Pocoyo and the League of Extraordinary Super Friends (Pocoyo in Cinemas: Your First Movie)
Angry Alien is back and is destroying the city using his U.F.O. So Pocoyo as a super hero and his team of his super friends (Pato, Elly, Nina, & Roberto including Elly's doll) join forces as they have to stop Angry Alien from his evil schemes.

Video games
In October 2007, Zinkia signed a video game publishing deal with Virgin Play for the video game Hello, Pocoyo!, planned for a release on the Nintendo DS in 2008. The game was developed in-house at Zinkia.

The second game, Pocoyo Racing was released for the Nintendo DS and Wii in 2011 being published by Zinkia Entertainment. On April 15, 2021, the third game, Pocoyo Party was released for the PlayStation 4 and Nintendo Switch published by RECOTechnology.

Alongside those games various app games have been released based on the franchise.

References

External links
 
 Official Pocoyo blog
 
 Guillermo García Carsi
  (Spanish)
  (English)

PBS Kids shows
2000s British animated television series
2000s Spanish television series
2010s animated television series
2010s Spanish television series
2020s Spanish television series
2020s animated television series
2005 Spanish television series debuts
2000s preschool education television series
2010s preschool education television series
2020s preschool education television series
BAFTA winners (television series)
British children's animated comedy television series
British computer-animated television series
ITV children's television shows
Animated preschool education television series
RTÉ original programming
British preschool education television series
Spanish children's animated comedy television series
Spanish preschool education television series
Television series by ITV Studios
Surreal comedy television series
2005 British television series debuts
Television series by Cosgrove Hall Films
Animated television series about children
Animated television series about ducks
Animated television series about elephants
Animated television series about dogs
Animated television series about birds
NHK original programming
Nick Jr. original programming
RTVE shows
Cartoonito original programming
Spanish-language television shows
English-language television shows